Salvador Chacón (born September 2, 1984) is a Mexican-American actor, producer and director best known for his role as Pablo in the FX original series Mayans M.C. He is also known for portraying the spokesperson for Nissan North American Hispanic market. Additionally he's appeared in NCIS  and The Chi. He is a founder and an executive producer at Wild Goats Creative and he is part of the directorial duo "Los Chacon" together with his sibling, photographer Aldo Chacon.

Early life 
Salvador Alfonso Gutiérrez Chacón a.k.a. Salvador Chacón was born in Mexico D.F. on September 2, 1984. He grew up between Mexico City and Cuernavaca Morelos and later moved to the U.S. to pursue a Drama degree at The University of Texas Pan-American. After graduating, he worked multiple jobs in film and Television before making the move to Los Angeles to focus on acting.

Career 
After moving to Los Angeles, Salvador started to work in advertising and commercials appearing in national and international campaigns for many American brands. Parallel to his commercial work he began to take roles in short films and web series that eventually led him to land roles in television shows such as NCIS and later Mayans M.C. and The Chi. Alongside his acting career, Chacón works as an Executive Producer for his company Wild Goats Creative.

Personal life 
Chacón resides between Los Angeles and Mexico City.

Filmography

Film

Television

Podcasts

Commercials 
Over 50 National and International spots, print and digital campaigns, including the spokesperson role for Nissan North American Hispanic market.

References

External links 
 

American film directors
American film producers
1984 births
Living people